The Air Force Institute of Technology (AFIT) is a graduate school and provider of professional and continuing education for the United States Armed Forces and is part of the United States Air Force. It is in Ohio at Wright-Patterson Air Force Base, near Dayton. AFIT is a component of the Air University and Air Education and Training Command.

Overview
Founded in 1919 and degree-granting since 1956, the Air Force Institute of Technology (AFIT) is the Air Force's graduate school of engineering and management as well as its institution for technical professional continuing education. AFIT is located at Wright-Patterson Air Force Base (WPAFB), Dayton, Ohio. Dayton's heritage and industrial base in aeronautics and aviation, coupled with the close proximity to the Air Force Research Laboratory (AFRL) and the National Air and Space Intelligence Center (NASIC) provide a scientific and engineering research and educational experience focused on producing future leaders of the Air Force.  A component of Air University and Air Education and Training Command, its primary purpose is to provide specialized education to select officer and enlisted U.S. military personnel and civilian employees.

On 8 May 2012, AFIT formally welcomed its first civilian director and chancellor during an appointment of leadership ceremony. Dr. Todd Stewart served for 34 years with the U.S. Air Force, retiring in 2002 at the rank of major general. On 28 January 2015, AFIT welcomed its first Provost and Vice Chancellor Dr. Sivaguru S. Sritharan former Dean of Engineering and Applied Sciences at the Naval Postgraduate School.

Academics
AFIT's four schools include:
 The Graduate School of Engineering and Management offers graduate programs leading to Master of Science and Doctor of Philosophy degrees in engineering, applied science, and management disciplines. The Graduate School has six departments:
 Aeronautics and Astronautics
 Electrical and Computer Engineering
 Engineering Physics
 Mathematics and Statistics
 Operational Sciences
 Systems Engineering and Management
 The School of Systems and Logistics teaches more than 80 professional continuing education courses in acquisition management, logistics management, contracting, systems management, software engineering, and financial management delivered to warfighters around the globe via customer focused delivery modes including resident, on-site, and online courses.
 The Civil Engineer School develops and delivers civil engineer and environmental professional continuing education and provides consultation in support of U.S. air and space forces.
 School of Strategic Force Studies manages the overall execution of nuclear (via the Nuclear College at (Kirtland Air Force Base) & cyber PCE (via AFIT at Wright-Patterson AFB).  The school provides responsive & relevant continuing education courses to more than 2,000 Air Force & DOD students annually.

AFIT has seven research centers funded by a number of federal agencies with interdisciplinary scope and international footprint representing a number of game changing scientific areas for the United States Air Force and the Department of Defense:
 Autonomy & Navigation Technology Center (ANT)
 Center for Directed Energy (CDE)
 Center for Cyberspace Research (CCR) and the Air Force Cyberspace Technical Center of Excellence (CyTCoE)
 Center for Operational Analysis (COA)
 Center for Space Research & Assurance (CSRA)
 Center for Technical Intelligence Studies & Research (CTISR)
 Scientific Test & Analysis Techniques in Test & Evaluation (STAT T&E)
 Nuclear Expertise for Advancing Technologies (NEAT) Center

Graduate School of Engineering and Management 
AFIT's Graduate School of Engineering and Management is a graduate-only, research–based institution and the sole degree-granting element of AFIT. The Graduate School focuses on studies and research that are relevant to the Air Force mission as well as the needs of the defense establishment as a whole. AFIT's Aeronautics & Astronautics Department has graduated nine U. S. astronauts including Guy Bluford (PhD 1978), first African-American astronaut. Since graduate degrees were first granted in 1956, AFIT has awarded 19,619 master's and 898 doctor of philosophy degrees.

It is classified among "R2: Doctoral Universities – High research activity".

Students 

The Air Force Institute of Technology (AFIT) enrolls over 700 full-time graduate students. The student body consists primarily of Air Force and Space Force officers, but is rounded out by members of the other four U.S. Armed Services, select enlisted Airmen, international students from coalition countries, U.S. Government civilians, and civilians (U.S. citizens) not affiliated with the Government. Selection of officers for graduate education is fully funded by their service and is based upon outstanding professional performance as an officer, promotion potential, and a strong academic background. Admission of non-Government affiliated civilians is based on academic preparation and requires U.S. citizenship. A substantial number of AFIT graduates are assigned to AFRL and NASIC upon graduation from AFIT. Many of the AFIT student thesis projects are influenced directly or indirectly by AFRL, NASIC, NRO and other Air Force and defense agencies.

Faculty 
The faculty body consists of approximately a 50–50 mix of military and civilian members all of whom hold a PhD in their fields. The faculty to student ratio is typically 1 to 5 in the master's degree programs.

Accreditation 
AFIT is accredited by the Higher Learning Commission of the North Central Association of Colleges and Schools to offer degrees to the doctorate level. Eight engineering programs in the Graduate School of Engineering and Management are accredited at the advanced level by the Accreditation Board for Engineering and Technology (ABET).

Academic calendar 
The institute operates year-round on a quarter calendar which includes the Fall, Winter, Spring, and Summer terms. The quarters are 10 weeks in length plus a week for examinations. Typically, the Fall term begins in late September and ends in mid-December; the Winter term begins in early January and ends in mid-March; the Spring term begins in late March and ends in mid-June; and the Summer term begins in late June and ends in early-September.

Cost 
The educational expenses for full-time military students assigned to AFIT are paid by their respective uniformed service. For tuition-paying students, the approximate cost is $4,512 per quarter for full-time enrollment (based on 12 quarter hours and a tuition rate of $376 per quarter-hour). AFIT is tuition-waived for civilian employees and military members of the Air Force or Space Force.

Civilian Institution Programs 
Through its Civilian Institution Programs, AFIT also manages the educational programs of officers enrolled in civilian universities, research centers, hospitals, and industrial organizations. Air Force students attending civilian institutions have earned more than 12,000 undergraduate and graduate degrees in the past twenty years.

Notable AFIT alumni 
 George W.S. Abbey – Former Director of the Johnson Space Center
 Brigadier General Russell J. Anarde, USAF, Ret.
 Captain Milburn G. Apt – The first pilot to achieve Mach 3
 General George T. Babbitt Jr., USAF, Ret.
 Brigadier General Rosanne Bailey, USAF, Ret.
 David Barish – Developer of the paraglider
 Lieutenant General Ted F. Bowlds
 Brigadier General Cary C. Chun
 Lieutenant General Roger G. DeKok, USAF, Ret.
 Lieutenant General William J. Donahue, USAF, Ret.
 General Jimmy Doolittle- Doolittle Raider
 Lieutenant General Hans H. Driessnack, USAF, Ret.
 Colonel Arnold L. Franklin Jr. USAF, Ret – In April 1986, as the 493rd Tactical Fighter Squadron, Franklin led the USAF raid on Libya.
 Dr. Russell Merle Genet – Pioneered the world's first fully robotic observatory
 Lt Col George E. Hardy, USAF, Ret – Tuskegee Airmen
 Brigadier General Harold R. Harris, USAF, Ret.
 General Robert T. Herres, USAF, Ret.
 General Charles R. Holland, USAF, Ret.
 Robert P. Johannes – One of the developers of the control configured vehicle (CCV) concept
 Lt Col Frank A. Kappeler, USAF, Ret – Doolittle Raider
 General George Kenney, USAF, Ret.
 Major General Donald L. Lamberson, USAF, Ret. – Considered the father of lasers in the Air Force
 Major General Louis G. Leiser, USAF, Ret.
 Donald S. Lopez, USAF, Ret. – Deputy Director of the Smithsonian's National Air and Space Museum
 Lieutenant John A. Macready – American Test Pilot and Aviator
 Lieutenant General Forrest S. McCartney, USAF, Ret.
 Lt Col Harry C. McCool, USAF, Ret – Doolittle Raider
 Lt John A. Macready, USAF, Ret – American test pilot and aviator
 General Bernard Schriever, USAF, Ret.
 General Lawrence Skantze, USAF, Ret.
 Major General Joseph K. Spiers, USAF, Ret.
 Lieutenant General James W. Stansberry, USAF, Ret.
 Lieutenant General William E. Thurman, USAF, Ret.
 Major General Jerry White (Navigators), USAF, Ret.
 Colonel Richard V. Wheeler, USAF, Ret. – American Test Pilot and Aviator
 Lt Col Archie Williams, USAF, Ret. – Gold medal winner of the 400 m sprint – 1936 Olympic Games in Berlin
 Michael Wynne – Former Secretary of the Air Force
 Dr. Steven M. Cron - retired Michelin engineer and co-inventor of the Tweel.

Current military leaders 
 Lieutenant General Joseph P. DiSalvo, USAF
 Lieutenant General John E. Wissler, USMC
 Major General William T. “Bill” Cooley, USAF
 Major General Dwyer L. Dennis, USAF
 Major General Scott W. Jansson, USAF
 Major General (S) John M. Pletcher, USAF
 Brigadier General Roy-Alan C. Agustin, USAF
 Brigadier General Kenneth T. Bibb Jr., USAF
 Brigadier General Eric T. Fick, USAF
 Brigadier General Gregory M. Gutterman, USAF
 Brigadier General David W. Hicks, USAF
 Brigadier General Linda S. Hurry, USAF
 Brigadier General Carl E. Schaefer, USAF
 Brigadier General Donna D. Shipton, USAF
 Brigadier General Brad M. Sullivan, USAF

NASA astronauts 
 Kevin A. Ford
 Michael E. Fossum
 William Anders
 Guion Bluford
 Mark N. Brown
 Gordon Cooper
 Albert H. Crews
 Donn F. Eisele
 John M. Fabian
 Gus Grissom
 James D. Halsell
 Steven Lindsey
 Richard Mullane
 Donald H. Peterson
 Major General Robert A. Rushworth, USAF, Ret.

Current civilian senior leaders
 Eileen A. Bjorkman
 L. Wayne Brasure
 Kevin W. Buckley
 Bruce A. Busler
 Charles G. "Chuck" Carpenter
 Mark A. Correll
 Daniel DeForest
 Mark A. Gallagher
 James F. Geurts
 Mr. Michael M. "Mike" Hale
 Kelly D. Hammett
 Robert Scott Jack II
 Brian A. Maher
 Charles L. Matson
 Richard W. McKinney
 David C. Merker
 Billy W. Mullins
 David F. O'Brien
 Gary A. O'Connell
 Charles N. "Pete" Peterson
 Steven K. Rogers
 David E. Walker
 Joseph D. "Dean" Yount

Former names
 Air School of Application 1919–1920
 Air Service Engineering School 1920–1926
 Air Corps Engineering School 1926–1941
 Army Air Forces Engineering School 1944–1945
 Army Air Forces Institute of Technology 1945–1947
 Air Force Institute of Technology 1947–1948
 United States Air Force Institute of Technology 1948–1955
 Institute of Technology, USAF 1955–1956
 Air Force Institute of Technology 1956–1959
 Institute of Technology 1959–1962
 Air Force Institute of Technology 1962–present

References 

Military education and training in the United States
Staff colleges
Institute of Technology
Universities and colleges in Ohio
Engineering universities and colleges in Ohio
Naval Postgraduate School
Wright-Patterson Air Force Base
 
Educational institutions established in 1919
Education in Dayton, Ohio
Education in Montgomery County, Ohio
1919 establishments in Ohio